Kikerino is a village in the Volosovsky District of the Leningrad Oblast. It is the administrative centre of the Kikerinsky Rural Settlement.

Kikerino was an urban-type settlement from April 20, 1930 until this was revoked as part of municipal reforms on 15 July 2004. It lies on the P.38 Gatchina - Volosovo - Opole road.

Peter Vaulin established a ceramic factory here in 1906. It produced Maiolica.

References

Leningrad Oblast articles missing geocoordinate data

Rural localities in Leningrad Oblast
Former urban-type settlements of Leningrad Oblast